The 37th National Assembly of Quebec, Canada, was elected in the 2003 Quebec general election, and sat from June 4, 2003 to March 10, 2006 (first session) and March 14, 2006 to February 21, 2007 (second session).

At dissolution, the 125 seats of the National Assembly were distributed as follows:

 Liberal member Daniel Bouchard (Megantic-Compton) sat as an independent after March 16, 2004.
 Liberal member Russell Williams (Nelligan) resigned on March 9, 2004. Yolande James (PLQ) won the by-election with 52.6% of the vote.
 Liberal member Marc Bellemare (Vanier) resigned on April 28, 2004. Sylvain Légaré (ADQ) won the by-election with 46.8% of the vote.
 Liberal member Christos Sirros (Laurier-Dorion) resigned on June 17, 2004. Elsie Lefebvre (PQ) won the by-election with 46.1% of the vote.
 Parti Québécois member André Boisclair (Gouin) resigned on August 17, 2004. Nicolas Girard (PQ) won the by-election with 57.8% of the vote.

By-elections were held in these four districts on September 20, 2004.

 Libéral member Yves Séguin (Outremont) resigned on May 26, 2005. Raymond Bachand (PLQ) won the by-election with 48.8% of the vote.
 Leader of the Opposition and Former Premier Bernard Landry (Verchères) resigned on June 6, 2005. Stéphane Bergeron (PQ) won the by-election with 69.2% of the vote.

By-elections were held in these two districts on December 12, 2005.

 Parti Québécois member André Boulerice (Sainte-Marie-Saint-Jacques) resigned on September 12, 2005. Martin Lemay (PQ) won the by-election with 41,2% of the vote.

A by-election was held in this district on April 10, 2006.

 Parti Québécois member Pauline Marois (Taillon) resigned on March 20, 2006. Marie Malavoy (PQ) won the by-election with 43,6% of the vote.
 Parti Québécois member Nicole Léger (Pointe-aux-Trembles) resigned on June 1, 2006. André Boisclair (PQ) won the by-election with 70,9% of the vote.

By-elections were held in these two districts on August 14, 2006.

 Parti Québécois member Jean-Pierre Charbonneau (Borduas) resigned on November 15, 2006.
 Liberal member Diane Legault (Chambly) resigned on November 15, 2006.

Member list
Cabinet Ministers are in bold, Leaders are in italics and the President of the National Assembly has a dagger next to his name.

Cabinet Ministers
 Prime Minister and Executive Council President: Jean Charest
 Deputy Premier: Monique Gagnon-Tremblay (2003–2005), Jacques P. Dupuis (2005–2007)
 Agriculture, Fisheries and Food: Françoise Gauthier (2003–2005) Yvon Vallières, (2005–2007)
 Employment, Social Solidarity and Family: Claude Béchard (2003–2005)
 Family (Delegate): Carole Théberge (2003–2005)
 Employment and Social Solidarity: Michelle Courchesne (2005–2007)
 Family, Seniors and Status of Women: Carole Théberge (2005–2007)
 Labor: Michel Després (2003–2005), Laurent Lessard (2005–2007)
 Government Administration and President of the Treasury Board: Monique Jérôme-Forget
 Information Access:Benoît Pelletier (2005–2007)
 Government online: Henri-François Gautrin (2005–2006)
 Government Services:Pierre Reid (2005–2006), Henri-François Gautrin (2006–2007)
 Culture and Communications: Line Beauchamp
 International Relations: Monique Gagnon-Tremblay
 Indian Affairs: Benoît Pelletier (2003–2005), Geoffrey Kelley (2005–2007)
 Canadian Francophonie: Benoît Pelletier (2005–2007)
 Health and Social Services:  Philippe Couillard
 Health and Status of Seniors (Delegate): Julie Boulet (2003–2005)
 Health, Social Services and Status of Seniors (Delegate): Julie Boulet (2003)
 Education: Pierre Reid (2003–2005), Jean-Marc Fournier (2005–2007)
 Relations with the Citizens and Immigration: Michelle Courchesne (2003–2005)
 Immigration and Cultural Communities: Lise Thériault (2005–2007)
 Youth Protection and Rehabilitation: Margaret Delisle
 Transportation: Yvon Marcoux (2003–2005), Michel Després (2005–2007)
 Transportation (Delegate): Julie Boulet (2003–2007)
 Canadian Intergovernmental Affairs: Benoît Pelletier
 Municipal Affairs and Regions: Nathalie Normandeau (2005–2007)
 Democratic Institutions Reform: Jacques P. Dupuis (2003–2005), Benoît Pelletier (2005–2007)
 Sport and Recreation: Jean-Marc Fournier
 Environment: Thomas J.Mulcair (2003–2005)
 Sustainable Development and Parks: Thomas J.Mulcair  (2005)
 Sustainable Development, Environment and Parks: Thomas J. Mulcair (2005–2006), Claude Bechard (2006–2007)
 Natural Resources, Wildlife and Parcs: Sam Hamad (2003–2005)
 Natural Resources and Wildlife: Pierre Corbeil (2005–2007)
 Forests, Wildlife and Parks: Pierre Corbeil (2003–2005)
 Justice: Marc Bellemare (2003–2004), Jacques P. Dupuis (2004–2005), Yvon Marcoux (2005–2007)
 Public Safety: Jacques Chagnon (2003–2005), Jacques P. Dupuis (2005–2007)
 Finances: Yves Seguin (2003–2005), Michel Audet (2007)
 Revenue: Lawrence Bergman
 Regional development and Tourism (Delegate): Nathalie Normandeau (2003–2005)
 Tourism: Françoise Gauthier (2005–2007)
 Interior Commerce Accord: Benoît Pelletier (2005–2007)
 Economic and Regional Development: Michel Audet (2003–2004)
 Economic and Regional Development and Research: Michel Audet (2004–2005)
 Economic Development, Innovation and Export Trade : Claude Béchard (2005–2006), Raymond Bachand (2006–2007)

External links
 Élections/Map of Quebec electoral districts
 2003 election results
 List of Historical Cabinet Ministers

Terms of the Quebec Legislature